Stymie is an obsolete golf rule.

Stymie or Stymies may also refer to:

Stymies, men's second team at Cambridge University Golf Club founded in 1869
Stymie Beard (1925–1981), American child actor in Our Gang
Stymie (horse) (1941–1962), American Thoroughbred racehorse